Gauhati Cine Club is a registered film society of Assam. It was founded by Dr Bhupen Hazarika on April 26, 1965, along with a handful of film lovers, critics, and writers. It was formed three years after the formation of the first film society of North East India “The Shillong Film Society” founded by Padum Barua, Md. Sadullah and some of film enthusiasts. The main objective of the society is to create awareness in the society about cinema as a serious art and to form an environment for serious discourse and debate in the cinematic and intellectual world. Since its inception, the society has been organizing Film Appreciation Courses with experts from the field, publishing books on film and holding workshops on film craft. It is registered under Societies Registration Act XXI of 1860. The current advisers of the club is Harekrishna Deka and Bhuban Chandra Lahkar and the president is A. K. Absar Hazaika.

Activities
The main focuses of the society are:
To arrange screening of films of national and international repute in every 2nd and 4th Saturday & Sunday of each month at Lakhmiram Barua Sadan, Guwahati.
To hold Jyotiprasad Agarwala Memorial Lecture once in every year.
To observe the Foundation Day.
To publish regularly Chitra Chinta, the annual journal of the society
To organize ‘Guwahati Film Festival’ from 2008 which was formerly known as ‘Festival of World Cinema’.
To publish books on films, film personalities and film world.
To organise short film festivals/shows on special occasion.
To conduct film shows at different educational institutions and small towns to create awareness among the people.
Maintain good relations with various Foreign Embassies to arrange exchange programme and screening of films.
To arrange interaction of audience with renowned filmmakers, directors and film personalities.
To organise Film Appreciation Course time to time.
Social activities.

Publications
The society is also publishing books on cinema. Some notable publications are:
Akira Kurosawa
Jyotiprasad as a Film Maker
Living Shadows
Perspectives on Cinema of Assam
Chitra Chinta

Jahangirnagar Students' Film Society is a registered film society of Jahangirnagar University and Federation of Film Societies of Bangladesh. It was founded by Fakhrul Arefin on February 14, 1999, along with a handful of film lovers of Jahangirnagar University in Bangladesh.

The main objective of the society is to create awareness in the society about cinema as a serious art and to form an environment for serious discourse and debate in the cinematic and intellectual world. Since its inception, the society has been organizing Film Appreciation Courses with experts from the field, publishing books on film and holding workshops on film craft.

Activities

To arrange screening of films of national and international repute in every Saturday & Monday of each week at room no 8 of Teachers-student centre of Jahangirnagar University.
To held International Film Week in every two year.
To observe the Foundation Day.
To organise film festivals/shows on special occasion.
To conduct film shows at different educational institutions and small towns to create awareness among the people.
Maintain good relations with various domestic organizations to arrange exchange programme and screening of films.
To arrange interaction of audience with renowned filmmakers, directors and film personalities.
To organise Film Appreciation Course time to time.
Social activities.

See also
Cinema of Assam
Jyoti Chitraban Film and Television Institute

References

External links
Official Website of GCC
Eastern Region : List of Societies

Cinema of Assam
Film organisations in India
Organisations based in Assam
Film societies
1965 establishments in Assam
Arts organizations established in 1965